The siege of Mariupol began on 24 February 2022 and lasted until 20 May, as part of the Russian invasion of Ukraine. It saw fighting between the Russian Armed Forces (alongside the Donetsk People's Republic People's Militia) and the Ukrainian Armed Forces for control over Mariupol. Lasting for almost three months, the siege ended in a victory for Russia and the Donetsk People's Republic, as Ukraine lost control of the city amidst Russia's eastern Ukraine offensive and southern Ukraine offensive; all Ukrainian troops remaining in the city surrendered at the Azovstal Iron and Steel Works on 20 May 2022, after they were ordered to cease fighting.

Mariupol is located in Ukraine's Donetsk Oblast, and following the siege, it was initially controlled by the Donetsk People's Republic, supported by occupying Russian troops. However, it was later subjected to Russia's annexation of southeastern Ukraine, and remains under direct Russian control .

During the Russian siege, the Red Cross described the situation in Mariupol as "apocalyptic" while Ukrainian authorities accused Russia of engineering a major humanitarian crisis in the city. Ukrainian officials reported that approximately 25,000 civilians had been killed and that at least 95% of the city had been destroyed during the fighting, primarily by large-scale Russian bombardments. In an official statement, the United Nations confirmed the deaths of 1,348 civilians in Mariupol, but warned that true death toll was likely thousands higher while also reporting that 90% of the city's residential buildings had been damaged or completely destroyed.

Major combat operations in the city effectively ended on 16 May 2022 after Ukraine's Azov Regiment surrendered at the Azovstal Iron and Steel Works. Some Western reports described the siege as a pyrrhic or symbolic Russian victory, with others noting that the humanitarian impact of the takeover was a "reputational disaster" for Russia. However, the loss of the city has also been seen as a significant defeat for Ukraine.

Background 

Mariupol was considered a major strategic city and therefore was a target for Russian forces. It was the largest city in the Ukrainian-controlled portion of Donetsk Oblast, and was also one of the largest Russian-speaking cities in Ukraine. Mariupol was a major industrial hub, home of the Illich and Azovstal Iron and Steel Works, and the largest city on the Sea of Azov.

Control of its port on the western shore of the Sea of Azov is vital to the economy of Ukraine. For Russia, it would allow a land route to Crimea and allow passage by Russian marine traffic. Capturing the city gave Russia full control over the Sea of Azov.

In 2014 after the Revolution of Dignity, Mariupol was swept by pro-Russian protests against the new government. Tensions erupted into the war in Donbas in early May, and during the unrest, militiamen of the separatist and Russian-backed Donetsk People's Republic (DPR) took control of the city and forced Ukrainian troops to abandon it during the first battle for Mariupol. However, the following month, Ukrainian forces recaptured the city in an offensive. In August, the DPR and Russian troops captured the village of Novoazovsk, 45 km east of Mariupol near the Russo-Ukrainian border. With the town captured and forces renewed, in September the DPR attempted to capture the city again in the second battle for Mariupol. Fighting reached the eastern outskirts, but the separatists were eventually repelled. In October, then-DPR Prime Minister Alexander Zakharchenko vowed to retake the city. Mariupol was then indiscriminately bombed by rockets in January 2015. Fearing a future third offensive into Mariupol, in February Ukrainian forces launched a surprise attack into Shyrokyne, a village located 11 km east of Mariupol with the objective of expelling the separatist forces from the city limits and creating a buffer zone. The separatists withdrew from Shyrokyne four months later. The conflict was frozen when the Minsk II ceasefire agreement was signed in 2015.

2018 saw again tension in the region around Mariupol, as the Russian Federal Security Service (FSB) coast guard fired upon and captured three Ukrainian Navy vessels after they attempted to transit from the Black Sea into the Sea of Azov through the Kerch Strait on their way to the port of Mariupol. The Kerch Strait incident raised tensions, and martial law was briefly declared by Ukraine in fears that a war would break out between the two countries.

One of the most instrumental groups for the recapture and subsequent defenses of Mariupol was the Azov Battalion, a Ukrainian volunteer militia, controversial for its openly neo-Nazi and ultranationalist members. By November 2014 Azov was integrated into the National Guard of Ukraine, with Mariupol as its headquarters. As one of Vladimir Putin's stated goals for the invasion was the "denazification" of Ukraine, Mariupol represented an important ideological and symbolical target for the Russian forces.

Prior to the siege, around 100,000 residents left Mariupol, according to the city's deputy mayor.

Prior to falling to Russian forces, the city was defended by the Ukrainian Ground Forces, the Ukrainian Naval Infantry, the National Guard of Ukraine (primarily the Azov Regiment), the Territorial Defense Forces of Ukraine, and irregular forces.

Advances to Mariupol

Preliminary shelling and advance on the city 
On 24 February, the day the invasion began, Russian artillery bombarded the city, reportedly injuring 26 people.

On the morning of 25 February, Russian forces advanced from DPR territory in the east towards Mariupol. They encountered Ukrainian forces near the village of Pavlopil, with Ukrainian forces defeating the Russian advance. Vadym Boychenko, mayor of Mariupol, said that 22 Russian tanks had been destroyed in the skirmish.

A US defense official stated that the Russians may have deployed thousands of marines from this beachhead.

On 26 February, Russian forces continued to bombard Mariupol with artillery. Later, the government of Greece announced that ten ethnic Greek civilians had been killed by Russian strikes at Mariupol, six in the village of Sartana and four in the village of Buhas.

On the morning of 27 February, Boychenko said that a Russian tank column had advanced on Mariupol from the DPR, but this attack was repulsed by Ukrainian forces, with six Russian soldiers captured. Later that day, a 6-year-old girl in Mariupol was killed by Russian shelling. Pavlo Kyrylenko, governor of Donetsk Oblast, stated that fighting in Mariupol had continued throughout the night of 27 February.

Throughout 28 February, the city remained under Ukrainian control, despite being surrounded by Russian troops and constantly shelled. Electricity, gas, and internet connection to most of the city was cut during the evening. Later, according to Radio Free Europe/Radio Liberty, Russian Major General Andrei Sukhovetsky was killed by a Ukrainian sniper near Mariupol, but other sources said that he had been killed during the Kyiv offensive.

Mariupol surrounded 

On 1 March, Denis Pushilin, the head of the DPR, announced that DPR forces had almost completely surrounded the nearby city of Volnovakha and that they would soon do the same to Mariupol. Russian artillery later bombarded Mariupol, causing over 21 injuries.

The city was fully surrounded on 2 March, after which the siege intensified. Russian shelling killed a teenager and wounded two other teenagers who were playing soccer outside. Boychenko announced the city was suffering from a water outage and had experienced massive casualties. He also said Russian forces were preventing civilians from exiting.

Later on 2 March, Russian artillery targeted a densely populated neighborhood of Mariupol, shelling it for nearly 15 hours. The neighborhood was massively damaged as a result, with deputy mayor Sergiy Orlov reporting that "at least hundreds of people are dead".

On the morning of 3 March, the city was shelled again by Russian troops. Eduard Basurin, the spokesman for the DPR militia, formally called on the besieged Ukrainian forces in Mariupol to surrender or face "targeted strikes". Russian Ministry of Defense spokesman Igor Konashenkov reported that DPR forces had tightened the siege, and that three nearby settlements had been captured.

On 4 March, Boychenko stated that the city's supplies were running out, and called for a humanitarian evacuation corridor and Ukrainian military reinforcements. He also stated that Russian BM-21 Grads were shelling the city's hospitals and that Mariupol residents no longer had heat, running water, or electricity. Later that day, a temporary ceasefire was proposed for the Mariupol region in order to allow citizens to evacuate.

On 5 March, the Ukrainian government announced its desire to evacuate 200,000 civilians from Mariupol. The International Committee of the Red Cross (ICRC) announced that it would act as a guarantor for a new ceasefire to allow for this evacuation. The Red Cross described the situation in Mariupol as "extremely dire". After three days of shelling, a ceasefire was announced to be in effect from 11:00 to 16:00. Civilians began to evacuate from Mariupol along a humanitarian corridor to the city of Zaporizhzhia. As civilians entered the evacuation corridor, Russian forces continued shelling the city, forcing evacuees to turn back.

Ukrainian authorities later reported that Russian forces had failed to observe the ceasefire and continued to shell the city. Russian officials accused Ukrainian forces of not allowing civilians to evacuate towards Russia. The DPR reported that only 17 civilians had been evacuated from Mariupol.

On 6 March, the Red Cross announced that a second attempt to evacuate civilians from Mariupol had again failed. Anton Herashchenko, a Ukrainian official, said the second attempt at a humanitarian corridor for civilians in Mariupol ended with a Russian bombardment. The Red Cross reported that there were "devastating scenes of human suffering" in Mariupol. Later in the morning, Inna Sovsun, a Ukrainian member of parliament, stated that the fuel pipeline that supplies Mariupol was damaged by Russian forces, leaving more than 700,000 people without heat, and suggested that people might freeze to death, as the temperature at the time often fell below . The bombardment also hit the city's last functioning cellular tower.

On 7 March, the ICRC Director of Operations stated that humanitarian corridor agreements had only been made in principle, without the precision required for implementation, needing routes, times and whether goods could be brought in to be agreed. The ICRC team had found that one of the proposed corridor roads was mined, and the ICRC was facilitating talks between Russian and Ukrainian forces.

On 8 March, another attempt to evacuate civilians was made, but the Ukrainian government accused Russia of violating the ceasefire again by bombing the evacuation corridor.

On 9 March, the Associated Press reported that scores of Ukrainian civilians and soldiers were being buried by city workers in a mass grave at one of the city's cemeteries. Russian shelling had hit the cemetery the previous day, interrupting the burials and damaging a wall. Later, another attempted ceasefire failed after Orlov reported that Russian soldiers had opened fire on construction workers and evacuation points. Orlov described the city's supply shortage as so severe that residents were melting snow to get water. Later that day, the Mariupol City Council issued a statement that a Russian airstrike had struck and destroyed a maternity ward and children's hospital. Ukrainian officials stated that three civilians were killed and at least 17 wounded.

Urban advances

Russian push into the city 

Ukraine's military stated on 12 March that Russian forces had captured the eastern outskirts of Mariupol. Later, a vehicle convoy of 82 ethnic Greeks was able to leave the city via a humanitarian corridor.

On 13 March, Boychenko stated that Russian forces had bombed the city at least 22 times in the previous 24 hours, with a hundred bombs, and added that the last food and water reserves in the city were being depleted. The Ukrainian Ministry of Internal Affairs said that the National Guard of Ukraine had damaged several Russian armored vehicles with artillery strikes during the day. İsmail Hacıoğlu, the head of the local Sultan Suleiman Mosque, stated that 86 Turkish citizens in the city were awaiting evacuation by the Turkish government.

More than 160 cars were able to leave the city on 14 March at 13:00 local time, the first evacuation allowed during the siege. The Russian Ministry of Defense stated that 450 tonnes of humanitarian aid had been brought to the city after Russian forces captured the outskirts. Ukrainian military officials were later said to have killed 150 Russian soldiers and destroyed 10 Russian vehicles.

On the same day, Ramzan Kadyrov, the head of Chechnya, stated that Chechen soldiers were participating in the siege and had briefly entered Mariupol before retreating. Kadyrov also stated that Adam Delimkhanov, a close ally and member of the State Duma, was the commander of Chechen forces in Mariupol. The funeral for Captain Alexey Glushchak of the GRU was held in Tyumen, and it was revealed he died near Mariupol, likely in the early stages of the siege.

On 15 March, around 4,000 vehicles with about 20,000 civilians were able to leave the city.

Ukrainian government official Anton Herashchenko said that Russian Major General Oleg Mityaev, commander of the 150th Motorized Rifle Division, was killed when Russian forces tried to storm the city. The Donetsk Regional Drama Theatre, sheltering hundreds of civilians, was hit by a Russian airstrike on 16 March and destroyed. Pavlo Kyrylenko, the governor of Donetsk Oblast, later stated that Russian forces had also targeted the Neptune swimming pool.

On 18 March, DPR forces said they had captured the Mariupol airport from Ukrainian forces. Clashes later reached the city center, according to the mayor and on 19 March, Russian and Ukrainian forces began fighting at the Azovstal steel plant. On the same day, President Volodymyr Zelensky awarded Colonel Volodymyr Baranyuk and Major Denys Prokopenko, leaders of the defense in Mariupol, the honor of Hero of Ukraine, the country's highest military award. During this time, while attempting to transport the killed and wounded to the hospital at Azovstal, Major Mykyta Nadtochii, commander of the Azov Regiment's second battalion, was wounded in a Russian airstrike.

On 20 March, the city council of Mariupol claimed Russian forces had forcefully deported "several thousand" people to camps and remote cities in Russia over the past week. Russia denied the accusation. The same day, an art school building, which had sheltered some 400 people, was destroyed in a Russian bombing. No information on casualties was immediately available.

An order by Russia's Ministry of Defence to surrender, lay down arms and evacuate the city was submitted on 20 March, requesting a written response by 02:00 UTC the next day. The ultimatum was rejected by the Ukrainian government and the mayor of Mariupol. By this point, one of the Ukrainian battalion commanders in the city described "bombs falling every 10 minutes".

On 21 March, the first helicopter evacuation from Azovstal took place as eight or nine seriously wounded soldiers were evacuated, including the wounded Major Nadtochii. Two Ukrainian Mil Mi-8 helicopters flew into Azovstal as part of "Operation Air Corridor", carrying a special forces team with crates of Stinger and Javelin missiles, as well as a satellite internet system. "Operation Air Corridor" lasted until 7 April, when one helicopter was shot down, followed by the shooting down of a second helicopter that was sent as part of rescue efforts to search for survivors of the first downing. The four special forces members on board the second helicopter were killed, along with the helicopter's crew. Ukraine claimed 85 seriously wounded soldiers were evacuated as part of "Operation Air Corridor" during seven missions to the Azovstal plant to resupply or deliver reinforcements using some 16 Mi-8s, in pairs or fours, two of which were shot down, along with the rescue helicopter, according to Major General Kyrylo Budanov. In contrast, Ukrainian president Zelensky stated 90 percent of helicopter pilots sent to Mariupol during the course of the siege to resupply Ukrainian forces and evacuate the wounded were lost due to Russian air-defenses. According to Russia, one Ukrainian Mil Mi-8 helicopter was shot down on 28 March, as it was heading to Mariupol to evacuate the leaders of the Azov Regiment. In addition, Russia reported its forces shot down two more Ukrainian Mi-8s on 5 April, as they were once again attempting to evacuate Azov commanders.

On 23 March, local authorities, including the mayor, left the city due to the deteriorating situation. The following day, Russian forces entered central Mariupol, seizing the Orthodox Church of the Intercession of the Mother of God. The city administration alleged that Russians were trying to demoralize residents by publicly shouting claims of Russian victories, including statements that Odessa had been captured.

Vadym Boychenko said on 27 March that while Mariupol was still under Ukrainian control, Russian forces had entered deep into the city and that the city's population needed a "complete evacuation". By this point, Ukrainian soldiers had run out of food and clean drinking water, and an analyst believed that Ukrainian forces would not be able to fight on beyond a few days. However, Ukrainian officers refused to evacuate from the city, as they did not want to abandon their wounded and dead soldiers and civilians. The "Club 8bit" computer museum was destroyed.

On 28 March, Mayor Vadym Boychenko said "we are in the hands of the occupiers today" in a televised interview, and a spokesman for the Mariupol mayor's office announced that "nearly 5,000 people" had been killed in the city since the start of the siege. The Ukrainian government estimated that "from 20,000 to 30,000" Mariupol residents had been forcibly sent to camps in Russia under Russian military control. During the day, Russian forces seized the administrative building in the northern Kalmiusky district and the military headquarters of the Azov Regiment. The next day, Russian forces were reported to have likely divided Ukrainian troops in the city into two and possibly even three pockets.

On 2 April, Russian forces captured the SBU building in central Mariupol, after which there was no more reported fighting in the area. On 4 April, one Ukrainian battalion surrendered, with Russian officials stating two days later they captured 267 Ukrainian marines from the 503rd Battalion of the Ukrainian Naval Forces. Due to the surrender, the lines between the Ukrainian 36th Separate Marine Brigade and the Azov Regiment had been broken. On 7 April, the DPR announced central Mariupol had been cleared of Ukrainian forces.

Meanwhile, Russian troops started an advance from the southwest on 1 April, leaving the Ukrainian military in partial control of the area around the port in the southwest of Mariupol by 7 April. On 4 April, a Russian Navy missile hit a Malta-based Dominica-flagged cargo ship, resulting in the ship catching fire. In addition, on 7 April, Russian forces captured a bridge leading to the Azovstal steel plant. The following day, Russian troops seized the southern part of Mariupol's port.

On 10 April, Russian forces captured the fishing port, separating Ukrainian troops in the port from those in the Azovstal steel plant into two pockets, while a possible third pocket was centered on the Illich steel plant to the north. The next day, DPR forces claimed to have captured 80% of Mariupol. Local Ukrainian forces expected the city to fall soon, since they were running out of ammunition, and analysts at the Institute for the Study of War believed that Mariupol would fall within a week.

Final pockets of resistance
On 11 April, Russian media reported that 160 Ukrainian servicemen from the 36th Separate Marine Brigade were captured with their equipment.

During the night between 11 and 12 April, Baranyuk led the 36th Separate Marine Brigade in an attempt to break out of the Russian encirclement at the Illich steel plant to the north. After being spotted they broke into smaller groups, with some of them managing to link up with fighters of the Azov Regiment at the Azovstal plant to the southeast. A large number of Ukrainian servicemen were either killed or captured during the breakout. The fate of Baranyuk initially remained unknown. Later, the DPR claimed that they had identified the body of Baranyuk after their special forces blocked the Ukrainian breakout. However, on 8 May, Baranyuk appeared alive in an interview with RT, along with the 36th Brigade's Chief of Staff Dmytro Kormiankov. They were reported to have been captured during the breakout attempt.

Around the same time at 11 April, a battalion of tankers of the 17th Tank Brigade, which were doing operations supporting the 36th Brigade, did not follow Baranyuk's plan and instead broke through the siege. They used two tanks, anti-aircraft guns and cars for transport, and after breaking out they proceeded on foot for 175 km until reaching friendly Ukrainian positions. For leading his men to safety, the unit's commander, Liutenant Colonel Oleg Grudzevych, was awarded a Hero of Ukraine medal.

On 12 April, Aiden Aslin, a British man fighting with the Ukrainian Marines, reported that his unit was going to surrender since they had run out of ammunition, food and other supplies. Subsequently, in the evening, Russia stated that 1,026 Marines of the 36th Separate Marine Brigade had surrendered at the Illich steel plant, including 162 officers and 400 wounded fighters. Later, Russia said it captured an additional 134 Ukrainian servicemen, bringing the total number of prisoners to 1,160. Ukraine confirmed nearly 1,000 Marines had been captured, including wounded and those who remained at the Illich plant. On 13 April, Russian forces secured the Illich plant, reducing the number of pockets in Mariupol to two, while Russia also announced it had taken full control of Mariupol's commercial port, which was confirmed three days later. The commander of the Azov Regiment, Prokopenko, criticized the servicemen that had surrendered, while praising those that managed to link up with his unit. Prokopenko, as well as Ukrainian intelligence officer Illia Samoilenko, also blamed Baranyuk for the large losses inflicted on Ukrainian forces, stating his actions were uncoordinated. According to Prokopenko, Baranyuk's breakout attempt was made without warning to other units and the direction of attack was not previously agreed upon, while Samoilenko called Baranyuk a "coward", stating he tried to flee the city, "taking with him people, tanks and ammunition".

Ukrainian military expert Oleg Zhdanov claimed that by this point the Russian 810th Guards Naval Infantry Brigade, originally sent from Feodosia, had suffered extremely heavy losses during the siege, to the extent of being "destroyed twice."

Resistance in the Azovstal steel plant

Withdrawal to Azovstal 

On 15 April, a Ukrainian military commander issued a plea for military reinforcements to come and "break the siege" of Mariupol. He also said that "the situation is critical and the fighting is fierce" but that sending reinforcements and breaking the siege "can be done and it must be done as soon as possible". On the same day, Ukrainian Defence Ministry spokesman Oleksandr Motuzianyk reported Russia started using Tu-22M3 long-range bombers to strike targets in Mariupol. The Azovstal iron and steel works, the heart of one of the remaining pockets of resistance, was well-defended and described as a "fortress within a city", as the steel plant was an enormous complex that made locating the Ukrainian forces difficult and had workshops that were difficult to destroy from the air. Additionally, the complex contained a system of underground tunnels, which would make clearing the entire complex challenging. During the day, Russian forces captured the base of the Ukrainian National Guard's , in western Mariupol.

On 16 April, DPR troops seized a police station near Mariupol's beach and Russian forces were confirmed to have seized the Vessel Traffic Control Center at the port. Several days after the port was captured, on 20 April, a Ukrainian Marine officer claimed Marine and Azov forces from the Azovstal plant conducted an evacuation operation of around 500 members of the Ukrainian Border Guard and National Police from the port, as they were running out of ammunition. According to the officer, the Ukrainian forces from the Azovstal pocket made an armoured breakthrough to the port and provided covering fire, as the 500 besieged soldiers retreated to the Azovstal plant. Subsequently, Russia announced all urban areas of the city had been cleared, claiming that Ukrainian forces only remained at the Azovstal Steel Plant. However, fighting was reported to be continuing near Flotskaya street in the western Primorsky District.

On 18 April, it was estimated that 95% of the city had been destroyed in the fighting. Ukrainian soldiers ignored a Russian ultimatum to surrender, deciding to fight to the end. Russia threatened to "destroy" those who continued to fight on. A military expert estimated that there could still be 500 to 800 Ukrainian soldiers holding out within the city, while Russian officials estimated that 2,500 Ukrainian soldiers and 400 foreign volunteers were holding out within the Azovstal plant.

Siege of Azovstal
On 20 April, Russian and DPR forces made small advances on the outskirts of the Azovstal plant. On 21 April, Russian President Vladimir Putin ordered Russian troops not to storm the Azovstal steel plant, but to blockade it instead until the Ukrainian forces there ran out of supplies. He also reported that "The completion of combat work to liberate Mariupol is a success", while a Ukrainian official rebutted Putin's comments, saying that Russia's choice of implementing a blockade over storming the steel plant meant that Russia had admitted their inability to physically capture Mariupol. General Sir Richard Barrons, former commander of the United Kingdom's Joint Forces Command, assessed that the battle for the plant was no longer "really relevant" in regard to the control of the city and its roads, since Russia and Crimea were now connected. In his opinion, defeating Ukrainian forces at the plant would have been "really difficult" for Russian troops without an "enormous cost to both sides". Despite the ordered blockade, Russian forces advanced within  of some of the Ukrainian positions.

On 22 April, the western Primorsky District was thought to be cleared by Russian forces, with no more reports of fighting, with all of the remaining Ukrainian forces surrounded in the Azovstal Steel Plant. On 23 April, according to Ukraine, airstrikes and an apparent ground assault recommenced on the Azovstal steel works. An advisor to the Ukrainian President said: "The enemy is trying to strangle the final resistance of the defenders of Mariupol in the Azovstal area". However, this could not be independently confirmed. Ukrainian security chief Oleksiy Danilov claimed that at night, a helicopter had resupplied Azovstal. On the same day, it was reported that Russia was redeploying forces from Mariupol to other fronts in eastern Ukraine, with Russia reportedly redeploying 12 units from Mariupol. On the next day, Russian forces continued bombing Ukrainian positions in the Azovstal Steel Plant, with reports that Russian forces might have been planning a renewed assault on the facility. During the night of 27 to 28 April, the heaviest airstrikes yet were reportedly conducted against Azovstal, with more than 50 strikes by Tu-22M3, Su-25s and Su-24s aircraft hitting the facility, according to Ukraine. Ukraine claimed a military field hospital was hit, with the number of wounded increasing from 170 before the strike to more than 600 after the bombing.

Evacuation of civilians 

On 30 April, the United Nations and the International Committee of the Red Cross (ICRC) started to run evacuations through a humanitarian corridor. This corridor was made after a trip by Secretary-General of the United Nations António Guterres to Moscow the previous week, where he personally brokered a deal. On 30 April 20 civilians had left the Azovstal steel plant, while Russian media claimed a number of 25. Talks were underway to try and release the remaining 1,000 or so civilians. At least two of the wives of members of the Azov Regiment called for a concurrent evacuation of the about 2,000 forces that would be left behind after the civilian evacuation, highlighting concerns of treatment as POWs by the Russians and lack of medical and food supplies.

On 2 May, about 100 civilians were reported to have been evacuated. Russian aircraft, according to the US Department of Defense, were using dumb bombs in Mariupol. Russian ground forces were also reported to be pulling out of the city, possibly to reinforce their positions elsewhere in the Donbas, where Russia was carrying out a large-scale offensive. According to one US DOD official: "Largely the efforts around Mariupol for the Russians are now in the realm of airstrikes". On 3 May, the Russian forces in Mariupol restarted their attacks on Azovstal. They began an assault on the steel plant in what have been called "difficult bloody battles". The following day it was reported the Russians had broken into the plant. Ukrainian politician Davyd Arakhamia said: "Attempts to storm the plant continue for the second day. Russian troops are already on the territory of Azovstal." On 5 May, some 300 civilians were allowed to leave due to Russia opening humanitarian corridors. These corridors ran from 8am to 6pm. Ukrainian forces blamed Russian success on an electrician who gave Russian forces information about the underground tunnel network, claiming: “Yesterday, the Russians started storming these tunnels, using the information they received from the betrayer.”

On 5 May, The Telegraph reported that Russia had intensified its bombing of the steel factory bunkers by using thermobaric bombs to increase the devastation of deployed firepower against the remaining Ukrainian soldiers who had lost all contact with the Kyiv government; in his last communications, Zelenskyy had authorized the commander of the besieged steel factory to surrender as necessary under the pressure of increased Russian attacks.

On 6 May, some 500 civilians, in total, had been evacuated according to the United Nations. The Azov Regiment reported one fighter killed and six wounded while helping evacuate civilians.

On 7 May, the Ukrainian government announced that all of the remaining women, children and elderly who had been inside the Azovstal steel plant had been evacuated.

Ukrainian surrender 

On 8 May, the commander of the 36th Separate Marine Brigade, Serhiy Volynskyi, asked "that a higher power find a way to figure out our rescue". As to their current conditions, "It feels like I've landed in a hellish reality show in which us soldiers fight for our lives and the whole world watches this interesting episode. Pain, suffering, hunger, misery, tears, fears, death. It's all real." President Zelenskyy promised "we are working on evacuating our military".

On 9 May, the Donetsk People's Republic held a Victory Day parade in Mariupol. The leader of the Republic, Denis Pushilin participated in the event. At the same time, a meeting took place near Mariupol involving Russian military representatives and Ukrainian commanders from Azovstal, including Major Prokopenko, who were brought to the meeting place by Russian armoured vehicles from Azovstal. During the meeting, the terms of the Ukrainians' surrender were agreed upon.

On 10 May, Ukrainian authorities reported that over 1,000 Ukrainian soldiers, hundreds of them wounded, remained trapped inside the Azovstal steelworks.

The Institute for the Study of War noted the lack of a Russian ground offensive on 12 May, but noted that Russian forces had likely secured the M14 highway the following day.

On 16 May, Alexander Khodakovsky, commander of a DPR brigade stationed near Azovstal, stated that a group of nine soldiers had come out of the plant to negotiate under a white flag. On the same day, the Ukrainian General staff announced that the Mariupol garrison had "fulfilled its combat mission" and that "evacuation" from the Azovstal steel plant had begun. The military said that 264 service members, 53 of them seriously wounded, had been taken by bus to areas controlled by Russian forces. A social media post was released by Azov Regiment commander Denys Prokopenko stating: "In order to save lives, the entire Mariupol garrison is implementing the approved decision of the Supreme Military Command and hopes for the support of the Ukrainian people." Wounded Ukrainian soldiers from the Azovstal plant were taken to the DPR-controlled town of Novoazovsk for treatment. The evacuation of wounded troops was followed in the subsequent days by the surrender of the remainder of the garrison. Ukrainian Deputy Defence Minister Hanna Maliar said: "Thanks to the defenders of Mariupol, Ukraine gained critically important time to form reserves and regroup forces and receive help from partners. And they fulfilled all their tasks. But it is impossible to unblock Azovstal by military means."

Russia press secretary Dmitry Peskov said Russian President Vladimir Putin had guaranteed that the fighters who surrendered would be treated "in accordance with international standards" while Ukrainian President Volodymyr Zelenskyy said in an address that "the work of bringing the boys home continues, and this work needs delicacy – and time". Some prominent Russian lawmakers called on the government to deny prisoner exchanges for members of the Azov Regiment. The ICRC registered the surrendered troops as prisoners of war at the request of both sides, collecting information to contact their families.

On 18 May, Russian artillery and aircraft bombed once again Azovstal's remaining defenders. The DPR leadership claimed that the local high-ranking Ukrainian commanders had not yet surrendered. According to Russian sources, the last defenders surrendered on 20 May, among them Lieutenant Colonel Prokopenko, Major Volynskyi and Captain Svyatoslav Palamar, deputy commander of the Azov Regiment. The Russian Ministry of Defense claimed that altogether 2,439 prisoners had been taken at Azovstal between 16 and 20 May, and that the steel plant was now under control of Russian and DPR forces.

Aftermath
On 18 May, Denis Pushilin announced Azovstal would be demolished by the Donetsk People's Republic, and Mariupol would be turned into a resort city.

Russian Telegram bloggers shared a video, reportedly showing Russian soldiers attacking some remaining Ukrainian holdouts at Azovstal on 22 May. Head of the DPR Denis Pushilin claimed that some Ukrainian holdouts had been discovered and captured in the area of the Azovstal plant.

On 26 May, Russia reopened the Port of Mariupol to commercial vessels following mine removal.

In an explosion at Olenivka prison on 29 July 2022, 53 Ukrainian prisoners of war from Mariupol were killed and 75 wounded. Both Ukrainian and Russian authorities accused each other of the attack on the prison. As of 30 July, there was no independent confirmation of what occurred.

City government's role 
Mariupol’s Mayor Vadym Boychenko had forced to leave Mariupol on February 27 after Ukrainian special services insistence. The information was received from the special services about the intentions of Russian sabotage groups to capture the legitimate mayor.

First Deputy Mayor Mykhailo Kohut remained in Mariupol, on Boychenko’s behalf, who was responsible for the direction of communal work and city defense.

According to the head of the patrol police of Mariupol Mykhailo Vershinin, Kohut helped with the defense of the city from Russian invaders and coordinated public utilities actions under intense shelling.

Kohut held his last meeting with public utilities on March 19, at that time street fighting was going on in the city. The last head of public services left the captured city on March 24.

Cholera outbreak 
The Ukrainian parliament stated on 30 April 2022 that the city's living conditions had been reduced to "medieval" levels, and that most of the city's sanitary and health infrastructure was destroyed, potentially putting the city's citizens at risk of disease.

In late April, the Mariupol City Council urged the evacuation of 100,000 residents, warning of "deadly epidemics" in the city.

On 28 April 2022, the Rospotrebnadzor issued a 40-paragraph resolution calling for additional measures to be taken in regards to drinking and waste water, especially in places which had become locations for Ukrainian refugees (specifically Belgorod, Bryansk, Kursk, Rostov and Voronezh Oblasts), as well as providing information to citizens about cholera by 1 June 2022. The government of Rostov Oblast announced that Ukrainian refugees in Russia would be tested for cholera.

On 17 May 2022, the World Health Organization warned of the possibility of cholera outbreaks in Ukraine, with WHO Regional Director for Europe Hans Kluge saying, "We are concerned about the potential cholera outbreak in occupied areas where water and sanitation infrastructure is damaged or destroyed." Such concerns were echoed by WHO Ukraine incident Manager Dorit Nitzan, who reported "swamps" of waste water on the streets of Mariupol, and claimed that there were cases of sewage and drinking water being mixed in the city.

On 6 June 2022, Ukrainian Deputy Minister of Healthcare Ihor Kuzin warned against a potential cholera outbreak in the city; saying that all preconditions for an outbreak were already present. In addition to Mariupol, Ukrainian task forces tested soil and drinking water in Kyiv, Zhytomyr, Chernihiv, and Sumy Oblasts. Shortly after his announcement, Russian occupational authorities imposed a quarantine on the city.

Mayor Boychenko said on 11 June that there was an outbreak of cholera in the city as sanitation systems were broken and corpses were rotting in the streets.

Spread 
Medical officials in Ukraine and Russia have cautioned that cholera could spread beyond Mariupol, with Russian government officials in oblasts bordering Ukraine establishing labs to treat cholera. Ukrainian epidemiologist Liudmyla Mukharska warned that the outbreak could spread throughout the rest of the Donbas, and that outbreaks of intestinal infections, dysentery, salmonellosis, and hepatitis A and E were possible. Other epidemiologists said that due to rotations of Russian soldiers fighting in Ukraine and the deportation of Ukrainians to filtration camps within Russia, the spread of the cholera outbreak to Russia was inevitable.

Casualties

Military casualties
According to Ukraine, around 6,000 Russian soldiers were killed during the siege, while Russia stated more than 4,000 Ukrainian soldiers had died up to the start of the siege of the Azovstal plant in mid-April and that the bodies of another 152 Ukrainian soldiers were found in a non-functioning refrigerated truck in Azovstal following the facilitie's siege. Explosives capable of destroying the bodies were found underneath them. The bodies would be handed over to Ukraine. By 12 June, Russia returned the bodies of some 220 deceased Ukrainian soldiers, all of whom had been fighting in the Azovstal steelworks, while "just as many bodies" still remained in Mariupol. A third of these were soldiers from the Azov unit. Subsequently, another 145 bodies of those killed in Mariupol were returned.

Ukraine claimed the 810th Naval Infantry Brigade of Russia's Black Sea Fleet had 158 killed, 500 wounded and 70 missing by mid-April, while the Black Sea Fleet's 126th Coastal Defence Brigade, a unit of about 2,000 soldiers, suffered 75 percent losses. In addition, Ukraine claimed 14 special forces members of the Russian Spetsnaz GRU were killed by late March.

According to Russia, some 3,917 Ukrainian soldiers were captured during the siege, while Ukraine confirmed more than 3,500 soldiers, with an additional battalion, were taken prisoner. On 8 June, over 1,000 prisoners of war were transferred from the DPR to Russia.

Civilian casualties 

Mariupol's deputy mayor Serhiy Orlov stated on 9 March that at least 1,170 civilians in the city had been killed in the city since Russia's invasion began and the dead were being buried in mass graves. On 11 March, the city council stated that at least 1,582 civilians had been killed during the siege, increasing that number on 13 March to 2,187 having been killed by the latter date. On 14 March, Oleksiy Arestovych, an adviser to Ukrainian president Volodymyr Zelenskyy, stated that more than 2,500 civilians had been killed in Mariupol's siege. However, the city council later clarified that 2,357 civilians had died.

Pyotr Andryushchenko, an adviser to the city government, however stated that the council's count was inaccurate and estimated that total number of civilians killed could be as high as 20,000. The New York Times reported that officials in the city had been struggling to account for how many civilians had died or gone missing during the siege. Videos posted on Telegram showed that residents of the Cheremushky neighborhood were forced to bury corpses in a courtyard, while others had to turn a post office building into a makeshift morgue, stacking it with dead bodies.

On 16 March, the Associated Press (AP) reported that it had documented that many of the dead were "children and mothers" contrary, it said, to Russian government claims that civilians had not been targeted. It also reported that doctors in Mariupol were saying that they were treating "10 injured civilians for every injured Ukrainian soldier."

On 11 April, Mariupol Mayor Vadym Boychenko stated that over 10,000 civilians had died in the Russian siege of Mariupol. On 12 April, city officials reported that up to 20,000 civilians had been killed. On the same day, the Mayor of the city reported that about 21,000 civilians had been killed. An updated Ukrainian death toll the following month put the number of civilians killed at at least 22,000.

By mid-June, The United Nations stated it had confirmed the deaths of 1,348 civilians, but said the true death toll was "likely thousands higher".

On August 29, President of Mariupol Television, volunteer and civil activist  Mykola Osychenko said to Dnipro TV that, according to the insider information, 87,000 deaths have been currently documented in morgues in Mariupol.  Besides, 26,750 bodies are buried in mass graves, and many more are buried in the yards of the apartment blocks and private houses, or still under the rubble.

In early November, Ukraine stated that at least 25,000 civilians had been killed in Mariupol. In late December, based on the discovery of 10,300 new mass graves, the Associated Press estimated that the true death toll may be up to three times that figure.

The Greek minority in Ukraine which is concentrated in and around Mariupol was impacted heavily by the fighting. Sartana and Volnovakha, two towns near Mariupol having substantial Greek population, were hit hard by Russian forces and nearly completely destroyed.

Humanitarian situation 

On 6 March, Petro Andryushchenko, advisor to the mayor of Mariupol, reported that people were "drinking from puddles in the streets" due to the loss of running water in the city caused by days of around-the-clock Russian shelling and bombing attacks. He also stated that there was no heat, electricity or telephone service. According to US officials, civilians had been unable to evacuate the city due to repeated ceasefire violations, attacks on agreed-upon evacuation corridors, and direct attacks on civilians attempting to evacuate.

On 14 March, another spokesman for the ICRC announced that "hundreds of thousands" of people in the city were "facing extreme or total shortages of basic necessities like food, water and medicine." On 15 March, Ukraine's Deputy Prime Minister Iryna Vereshchuk accused Russian forces of taking around 400 civilians hostage after capturing a hospital in the city. Ukrainian officials accused Russian forces of firing at an evacuation convoy and injuring five civilians on 16 March. On 18 March, Ukrainian officials stated that more than 350,000 people were sheltering under siege in Mariupol, still with no access to food or water.

On 21 March, CNN reported that an official in Mariupol said that people are afraid, due to the constant bombing and shelling, to leave their underground shelters even to obtain food and water, meaning they were trying to drink less and eat less. On 22 March, CNN reported that the Russian Army had confiscated 11 buses that were headed into the city in order to evacuate citizens. Fox News later reported that at least some of the buses were filled with humanitarian supplies which were taken. It was also reported that 15 aid workers in the buses have been arrested while trying to get food into Mariupol. CNN also reported that to that date, all attempts to bring empty buses into Mariupol to evacuate civilians had failed. On 23 March, Ukrainian President Zelenskeyy announced that 100,000 civilians were still unable to get out of Mariupol and that they were trapped in "inhumane conditions" without food, running water or medicine.

On 1 April, a rescue effort by the UN to transport hundreds of civilian survivors out of Mariupol with 50 buses failed.

Ultimately the ICRC reported that it had helped facilitate the safe evacuation of over 10,000 civilians from Mariupol and Sumy.

War crimes committed by Russian forces 

Numerous war crimes were committed by Russian forces during the siege. Some media outlets described the crimes that occurred as the worst seen in the 21st century.

On 25 March, Russian Colonel-General Mikhail Mizintsev was accused by Ukrainian authorities of ordering the bombings of both the Mariupol Children's and Maternity Hospital and the city theatre where 1,200 civilians were sheltering. Mizintsev was nicknamed the "Butcher of Mariupol" by western and Ukrainian sources as a result of his alleged role in the siege, and sanctioned by the United Kingdom. Accused of personally directing war crimes during the siege, Mizintsev accused Ukrainian troops of creating a "terrible human catastrophe," and furthermore claimed that he would allow the safe exit of Ukrainian civilians from Mariupol. Mizintsev's claims were rejected by Deputy Prime Minister of Ukraine Iryna Vereshchuk as "manipulation."

Shooting of evacuation checkpoints 
On 7 March, U.S. ambassador to the Organization for Security and Co-operation in Europe, Michael Carpenter, described two incidents that occurred in Mariupol on 5 and 6 March as war crimes. He stated that on both dates, Russian forces bombed agreed-upon evacuation corridors while civilians were trying to use them.

Maternity and children's hospital bombing 

On 9 March, after an airstrike damaged a maternity ward and children's hospital, Ukrainian President Volodymyr Zelenskyy tweeted that the attack was an "atrocity" along with a video of the building's ruins. The hospital was destroyed. Three people were killed, including a young girl and at least 16 were injured; authorities stated that many more patients and hospital staff were buried under rubble from the blast.

Russian foreign minister Sergey Lavrov said that the building was formerly a maternity hospital, and Russia bombed it because it was then occupied by the Azov Regiment.

Later on the same day, Russian Ministry of Foreign Affairs spokeswoman Maria Zakharova rejected the hospital bombing as "information terrorism", while Russian Ministry of Defence spokesman Igor Konashenkov called the bombardment staged.

Then, on the afternoon of 10 March, the Russian Embassy to the UK said in a tweet that two injured pregnant women seen being evacuated after the attack were actually played by actresses wearing "realistic make-up", that the maternity ward was occupied by the Azov Regiment and that no women or children had been present since the facility was "non-operational". The tweet was later removed by Twitter for violating their rules on disinformation. Dmitry Peskov, the press secretary for the Russian President, stated soon after the bombing that the Russian government would investigate the incident.

The accusation by Russia then began trending online in Russia, including on Russian Telegram social media, which has hundreds of thousands of followers. Twitter then took down the embassy's posts.

The pregnant woman videotaped being carried out wounded on a stretcher (accused by Russia of being an actress) was moved to another hospital and then died on 13 March, after her child was stillborn. She had suffered numerous injuries in the bombing, including a crushed pelvis and detached hip, which contributed to the stillbirth of her child. Seeing that she had lost her baby, medical workers said that she cried, "Kill me now." Thirty minutes later, she also died.

Russian claims that the videos were faked and that the bombed hospital was being used as a military post were debunked by investigative reporters. On 22 March, Russian journalist Alexander Nevzorov was charged under Russia's "false information" law after he published information about the Russian shelling of a maternity hospital in Mariupol. Under a new law passed on 4 March, he could be sentenced to up to 15 years in prison.

Regional theatre bombing 

On 16 March, the Donetsk Regional Drama Theatre of the city was struck and largely destroyed by an airstrike. The Mariupol city council accused Russia of targeting the drama theatre, where at least hundreds of civilians had been sheltering. Human Rights Watch stated that the theatre was sheltering at least 500 civilians. Serhiy Taruta, the former governor of Donetsk Oblast, stated that 1,300 were sheltering inside.

A satellite image taken by Maxar Technologies on 14 March showed that the Russian word for "children" was written in large white letters on the pavement in both the front and the back of the theatre, which would make it clear that civilians were sheltering inside. Ukrainian Minister of Foreign Affairs Dmytro Kuleba claimed that Russia "could not have not known this was a civilian shelter". According to the Verkhovna Rada, it was impossible to start rescue operations at the theatre due to the ongoing shelling. The city council also stated that access to the shelter in the theatre was blocked by debris. The Russian Defense Ministry denied attacking the building and accused the Azov Regiment of blowing it up.

The bomb shelter in the basement, where people had been sheltering, however, was able to resist the attack according to Taruta. Survivors began emerging from the remains of the theatre on 17 March. More than 130 civilians had been rescued from the basement as of 18 March, according to Ukrainian officials, and rescuers had yet to find any fatalities. The city council stated that no one had died according to initial information, but one person was gravely wounded.

The Associated Press reported that 600 civilians were killed during the airstrike, double the official number given by the Ukrainian government.

Mass shelling of residential areas 

On 2 March, deputy mayor Sergiy Orlov reported that Russian artillery targeted a densely populated neighborhood of Mariupol, shelling it for nearly 15 hours. He said that one populated residential district on the city's left bank had been "nearly totally destroyed".

Satellite photos of Mariupol taken the morning of 9 March taken by Maxar Technologies showed "extensive damage" to high-rise apartments, residential homes, grocery stores and other civilian infrastructure. This was determined by comparing before and after photos. The Mariupol council made a statement that the damage to the city has been "enormous". It estimated that approximately 80% of the city's homes had been significantly damaged, of which almost 30% were beyond repair. Reporting from Mariupol, Reuters reporter Pavel Klimov said that "all around are the blackened shells" of tower block dwellings.

On 16 March, BBC News reported that nearly constant Russian attacks had turned residential neighbourhoods into "a wasteland." On the same day it reported that it had obtained drone footage showing "a vast extent of damage, with fire and smoke billowing out of apartment blocks and blackened streets in ruins." A city resident told the BBC that "in the left bank area, there's no residential building intact, it's all burned to the ground." The left bank contained a densely populated residential district. She also said that the city centre is "unrecognisable." On the same day the Institute for the Study of War (ISW) reported that Russian forces continued to commit war crimes in Mariupol including "targeting civilian infrastructure."

On 18 March, Lieutenant General Jim Hockenhull, Chief of Defence Intelligence for the United Kingdom (UK), described "continued targeting of civilians in Mariupol". Ukrainian authorities stated that about 90% of buildings in Mariupole were now damaged or destroyed. On the same day, Sky News from the UK described videos as showing "civilian areas left unrecognisable by the bombing." Sky News also quoted the Red Cross as describing "Apocalyptic destruction in Mariupol." On 19 March 2022, a Ukrainian police officer in Mariupol made a video in which he said "Children, elderly people are dying. The city is destroyed and it is wiped off the face of the earth." The video was authenticated by the Associated Press.

The government of Mariupol said on 28 March that 90% of all buildings in Mariupol had been damaged by shelling, with 40% of all structures inside the city destroyed. The statistics released also counted that 90% of Mariupol's hospitals had been damaged, and that 23 schools and 28 kindergartens had been destroyed by Russian shelling.

By 18 April, Ukrainian officials estimated that at least 95% of Mariupol had been destroyed in the fighting, largely as a result of the Russian bombing campaigns.

On 12 April, city officials reported that up to 20,000 civilians had been killed. On the same day, the Mayor of the city reported that about 21,000 civilians had been killed.

Alleged use of chemical weapons
On 11 April 2022, Eduard Basurin, a spokesperson for the Donetsk People's Republic, called for Russia to bring "chemical forces" to "smoke out the moles", referring to the Ukrainian forces in the Azovstal. Later on the same day, the Azov Regiment accused Russian forces of using "a poisonous substance of unknown origin" in Mariupol, causing respiratory problems. A Pentagon spokesperson said the reports were not confirmed, but they reflect concerns about Russia's potential use of chemical agents. Later, Ukraine stated that it was investigating the allegations. Three Ukrainian soldiers were injured in the incident.

According to experts, it is too soon to say what exactly had happened, UK and Ukrainian officials said that they suspected the use of white phosphorus, which is not typically regarded as a chemical weapon in international law.

Media coverage 
Associated Press staff member Mstyslav Chernov and freelancer Evgeniy Maloletka, working for AP, stayed in Mariupol from late February until 11 March. They were among the few journalists, and, according to the AP, the only international journalists in Mariupol during that period, and their photographs were extensively used by Western media to cover the siege and the situation in the city. According to Chernov, on 11 March, they were in a hospital taking photos, when they were evacuated from the city with the assistance of Ukrainian soldiers. They managed to escape from Mariupol unharmed, at which point, he said, no journalists were left in the city.

Testimonies from the Azovstal steel plant were made available via the Starlink satellite connections system.

The propaganda in the state-controlled media in Russia presented the invasion as a liberation mission and accused Ukrainian troops of attacking civilian targets in Mariupol.

The Guardian observed in a piece on Mariupol published after the Russian attack on the Mariupol maternity ward that "Entire settlements reduced to rubble, attacks on civilian targets and the bombing of refugee exit routes were all part of Moscow’s brutal Syria campaign", while the Washington Post under the headline "Russia’s Ukraine war builds on tactics it used in Syria, experts say" related the effects on the civilian population as "dwindling food supplies. No electricity or water. Russian tanks roaming the streets. Nights punctuated by shelling." Ukrainian officials warned that this battle risked "becoming a second Aleppo." The Syria Civil Defense team said "They want to empty those cities of their population, so it will be less costly for Russia to take over," and indeed some estimates were that 75% of Mariupol’s population had left by 31 March.

See also 

 War in Donbas (2014–2022)
 Russian occupation of Donetsk Oblast
 Russian occupation of Luhansk Oblast
 List of military engagements during the 2022 Russian invasion of Ukraine
 Timeline of the 2022 Russian invasion of Ukraine

Notes

References

External links 
 Yahoo News UK article about 11 year old Ukrainian gymnast Kateryna Dyachenko who was killed during shelling in Mariupol on 22 March
 BBC News video of recently evacuated Mariupol civilians speaking about desperate conditions in the city, endless shelling, mass casualties and people having mental breakdowns under siege, 8 April 2022
 Video of drone flyover of apartment buildings being bombed in Mariupol. News.com.au, The News Room, March 15 2022
 Video of tanks firing repeatedly on apartment buildings in Mariupol, civilians in hospital, woman crying for dead children. AP News, 12 March 2022.
 Video of aftermath, including injured pregnant woman being carried, after Russian airstrike on hospital in Mariupol, Ukraine. Sky News, March 9, 2022
 Video posted on Twitter by a Ukrainian soldier in Mariupol – of shelling and damage in the City, 5 March, 2022, 8:27 AM
 Video, Sergei Orlov, Deputy Mayor of Mariupol, alleges that on 5 March Russian forces targeted and shelled civilian gathering areas where people were preparing to evacuate the city. Channel 4 News, London, UK

Siege of Mariupol
Mariupol
February 2022 events in Ukraine
March 2022 events in Ukraine
April 2022 events in Ukraine
May 2022 events in Ukraine
Mariupol
Mariupol
War crimes during the 2022 Russian invasion of Ukraine
Forced migration
Urban warfare
Last stands